Trichosanthes is a genus of tropical and subtropical vines. They belong to the cucumber family (Cucurbitaceae), and are closely related to Gymnopetalum. Hodgsonia, formerly included here, is usually considered a well-distinct genus nowadays.

The shoots, tendrils, and leaves of some or possibly all species may be eaten as greens, and at least two species (serpent gourd, T. cucumerina, and pointed gourd, T. dioica) are grown commercially for their fleshy fruits used as vegetables, most popular in South Asia and Southeast Asia. At least two species (T. kirilowii and T. rosthornii) are grown for use in traditional Chinese medicine, where they are called the name gualou. Trichosanthes is also known as a medicinal as well as poisonous plant in India. The herb has shown an ability to reduce chest congestion by breaking down phlegm and aiding in its removal from the lungs.

Selected species

 Trichosanthes baviensis Gagnepain
 Trichosanthes cochinchinensis (Lour) M. Roem.
 Trichosanthes cucumerina – Serpent gourd, Padwal; dhunduli (Assamese); chichinga/chichinge (Bengali); paduvalakaayi (Kannada); padavalanga (Malayalam); purla (Sambalpuri); pathola (Sinhala); Pudol, Kurattai OR Sauri (Tamil); potlakaaya (Telugu)
 Trichosanthes cucumerina var. anguina – Snake gourd
 Trichosanthes dioica – Pointed gourd,  (Hindi),  /  (eastern India & Northeastern Andhra)
 Trichosanthes dunniana Levl.
 Trichosanthes fissibracteata C.Y.Wu ex C.Y.Cheng & Yueh
 Trichosanthes globosa Blume
 Trichosanthes homophylla Hayata
 Trichosanthes kerrii Craib
 Trichosanthes kinabaluensis Rugayah
 Trichosanthes kirilowii – "gualou" (China) (= T. japonica)
 Trichosanthes laceribractea Hayata
 Trichosanthes lepiniana (Nuad.) Cogn.
 Trichosanthes montana Rugayah
 Trichosanthes pedata Merr. & Chun
 Trichosanthes pendula Rugayah
 Trichosanthes pilosa (Ser.) Maxim in Franch. & Sav. - Japanese snake gourd; karasuuri[烏瓜] (Japanese)
 Trichosanthes pentaphylla F.Muell. ex Benth.
 Trichosanthes postarii W.J.de Wilde & Duyfjes
 Trichosanthes quinquangulata A.Gray
 Trichosanthes reticulinervis C.Y.Wu ex S.K.Chen
 Trichosanthes rosthornii Harms – "gualou" (China) (= T. uniflora)
 Trichosanthes rubiflos Thorel ex Cayla
 Trichosanthes rugatisemina C.Y.Cheng & Yueh
 Trichosanthes schlechteri Cogn. ex Harms
 Trichosanthes sepilokensis Rugayah
 Trichosanthes sericeifolia C.Y.Cheng & Yueh
 Trichosanthes subrosea C.Y.Cheng & Yueh
 Trichosanthes subvelutina F.Muell. ex Cogn.
 Trichosanthes tricuspidata Lour. (= T. bracteata, T. palmata)
 Trichosanthes truncata C.B.Clarke
 Trichosanthes villosa Blume
 Trichosanthes wallichiana (Ser.) Wight
 Trichosanthes wawraei (Ser.) Xianyu.W

In addition, several hybrids are known in this genus.

Formerly placed in Trichosanthes were for example Kedrostis foetidissima and Linnaeosicyos amara.

References

External links 
 
 Multilingual taxonomic information from the University of Melbourne
 ITIS report

 
Cucurbitaceae genera
Medicinal plants
Taxa named by Carl Linnaeus
Plants described in 1753